Bishwo Shahitto Kendro (BSK) (meaning 'World-Literature Centre'), is a non-profit institution in Bangladesh to promote reading habits, enlightenment and progressive ideas among students and general public. Popularly known as just Bhrammaman Library (mobile library), this institution was established by famous writer, television presenter, organiser, and activist Abdullah Abu Sayeed. Sayeed was given the 97th Ramon Magsaysay Award in Journalism, Literature, and Creative Communication Arts for "... cultivating in the youth of Bangladesh a love for literature and its humanizing values through exposure to the great books of Bengal and the world" – which was a recognition of the contribution of the library.

Activity 
Bishwo Shahitto Kendro offers classes on world literature for Higher Secondary students, and also provides every book for those classes. For Secondary and Junior school level it operates a nationwide reading program, and provides books for the students. In 2007, it had 500 schools under this program, and over 100000 active student members.

Besides these programs, Bishwo Shahitto Kendro actively maintains libraries across the nation. It pioneered the concept of mobile library in Bangladesh, which carries books around the country. Since books are expensive and libraries are not available at all – these mobile libraries are getting very popular. Bishwo Shahitto Kendro also arranges reader's forum and discussions, which are open to everyone who is interested. These events are open to new thoughts and encourages thoughtful logical discussions. Through these endeavours Bishwo Shahitto Kendro is continuing its works with a motto that says – "We want enlightened humans".

Bishwo Shahitto Kendro activities are mostly based in Bangladesh. It also has an office in New York.

Awards
 2008 UNESCO Jan Amos Comenius Medal.

References

External links

 
 
 2005 CNN interview with the founder of Bishwa Sahitya Kendra
 

Cultural organisations based in Bangladesh
Education in Bangladesh
Bengali language
Bengali literary institutions
1980 establishments in Bangladesh
Learned societies of Bangladesh